Rufoclanis jansei is a moth of the family Sphingidae. It is known from South Africa, Zimbabwe and Tanzania.

References

Rufoclanis
Lepidoptera of South Africa
Lepidoptera of Tanzania
Lepidoptera of Zimbabwe
Moths of Sub-Saharan Africa
Moths described in 1964